Whalerider is the soundtrack album to the film Whale Rider, by the Australian singer/musician Lisa Gerrard.  The album was released on the 4AD label in 2003.

The music on the album is also included in the film.  In the liner notes, Gerrard describes the experience of recording music for Whale Rider as "one of the most intimate of my artistic life."

Personnel
Lisa Gerrard – composer, performer, arranger
Phil Pomeroy – piano on "Pai Theme"

Additional performances by:

Keisha Castle-Hughes on "Paikea Legend", "Pai Calls the Whales" and "Go Forward"
Rawiri Paratene on "Biking Home"
Keriana Thomson and the Wananga Boys on "Paikea's Whale"
The people of Ngati Kondhi, Whangara performing the haka on "Waka in the Sky" and "Go Forward"

Mixed by Simon Bowley
Mastered by Jacek Tuschewski
Design by Jacek Tuschewski

Track listing

References
 WhaleRider OST liner notes
 Dead Can Dance | Il Sito Italiano

APRA Award winners
Lisa Gerrard albums
2003 soundtrack albums
4AD soundtracks
Drama film soundtracks